The Los Altos Town Crier is an American independently owned paid newspaper which serves the city of Los Altos and surrounding Santa Clara County, California. The newspaper was founded in 1947 and covers local news, sports, business and community events. It is published weekly on Wednesday and is mailed to the households of the residents of Los Altos, Los Altos Hills and Mountain View. According to the American Newspaper Representatives, the Los Altos Town Crier has a total circulation of 16,500. The paper's Editor-in-Chief is Bruce Barton and it is owned by LATC Media Inc.

History 
In 1960, the Los Altos Town Crier organized the first Midnite Run as a way of "promoting the fitness, good health and enjoyment running offers" - as written in The Times Standard - to members of the community.  Since then, the event is held annually on New Years Eve with on average 2,500 runners.

In 1978, Los Altos Town Crier was involved heavily in reporting the death of a high school Sophomore at the Los Altos High School. The newspaper reported the clothing and last known whereabouts of the victim.

In 1986, The Citizen's Voice reported that the San Jose newspapers have a combined circulation of 85,000. The San Jose newspapers include Los Altos Town Crier, Campbell Press, Cupertino Courier and others.

In 1988, Los Altos Town Crier, along with four other Santa Clara County weekly newspapers a part of the Donnelly Newspaper joined three weekly newspapers owned by the Times Tribune.

In 1993, it was reported by the Santa Cruz Sentinel that the Town Crier for years has carried accounts of a local resident's fight with the city and neighbors over his development plans for a 100-acre property. In the same year the newspaper was purchased by Select Communications. When the Peninsula Times Tribune ceased publication the Los Altos Town Crier faced closure, among two other weekly newspapers. Prior to this change, the paper was owned by Chicago based-Tribune Co., which also owned the daily Times Tribune.

1996, Los Altos Town Crier voted Charley Chinese Restaurant "Best" restaurant in Los Altos. For this title, the Chinese restaurant also had the support of KGO Radio and Palo Alto Times Tribune.

Los Altos Town Crier is known as the "newspaper where local legal notices are posted" as described in 2010 in the Honolulu Star Advertiser.

In 2019, three employees and Los Altos businessman Dennis Young bought the Town Crier from longtime publishers Paul and Liz Nyberg. The new ownership team, LATC Media Inc, includes Co-Publishers Dennis Young and Howard Bischoff, Vice President of Operations Chris Redden and Vice President of Sales and Marketing Kathy Lera.

Awards 
In 2017, the Los Altos Town Crier won 1st place in the Sports Feature Photo category in its division of  California's Better Newspapers Contest.

References 

1947 establishments in California
Weekly newspapers published in California
Los Altos, California